Manciano  may refer to several places in Italy:

Manciano, a comune in the Province of Grosseto, Tuscany
Manciano (Trevi), a frazione of Trevi in the Province of Perugia, Umbria
 Manciano, a locality of Morlupo in the Province of Rome, Lazio 
Manciano La Misericordia, a frazione of Castiglion Fiorentino in the Province of Arezzo, Tuscany